Bento Gonçalves da Silva (23 September 1788 – 18 July 1847), was a Brazilian army officer, politician and rebel leader of the Riograndense Republic. He was the first President of the Riograndense Republic and, by all accounts, one of the most prominent figures in the history of Rio Grande do Sul.

Although a staunch monarchist, Gonçalves led the rebel forces in the Ragamuffin War. Radicals within the rebel ranks forced the rebellion to become republican, something that Gonçalves opposed. Still, even though he fought against the Empire of Brazil, Gonçalves and his troops celebrated the birthday of the young emperor Pedro II of Brazil. After the conflict ended with the victory of the Empire, Gonçalves paid his respect to Pedro II by kissing his hand during the latter's trip to Rio Grande do Sul in December 1845. 

His main companions in arms during the rebellion were Antônio de Souza Neto and Giuseppe Garibaldi.

References

Bibliography
 

1788 births
1847 deaths
Goncalves da Silva, Bento
Goncalves da Silva, Bento
Brazilian people of Portuguese descent
Goncalves da Silva, Bento
Heads of state of former countries